James Husker Lynch (born January 20, 1999) is an American football nose tackle for the Minnesota Vikings of the National Football League (NFL). He played college football at Baylor.

Early life and high school
Lynch grew up in Round Rock, Texas and attended Round Rock High School, playing defensive line and punter on the school's football team. He was named the District 13-6A lineman of the year in each of his final two high school seasons. As a senior, Lynch recorded 46 tackles, 14 tackles for loss, 8 sacks, 3 pass breakups, 3 fumbles recoveries and a forced fumble and punted 27 times for an average of 43.7 yards. He initially committed to play college football at Texas Christian before switching his commitment to USC. Lynch de-committed again during his senior year before deciding to play at Baylor.

College career
Lynch played in 11 games during his true freshman season as a member of the Bears' defensive tackle rotation and was named a Freshman All-American by ESPN after making 20 tackles (five for loss), three sacks (most among Big 12 freshmen) and a fumble recovery. As a sophomore, he led the team with 5.5 sacks and nine tackles for loss and was named first-team All-Big 12 by the Associated Press and to the second-team by the league's coaches.

Lynch was named preseason first-team All-Big 12 and to the Chuck Bednarik Award watchlist entering his junior season. Lynch was named first-team All-Big 12, the Big 12 Defensive Lineman of the Year, the conference Defensive Player of the Year and was a unanimous All-America selection after finishing the regular season with 41 tackles, 19.5 tackles for loss and a conference-high 13.5 sacks along with three forced fumbles, two fumble recoveries, five passes defended and two blocked kicks. Lynch announced that he would forgo his senior season to enter the 2020 NFL Draft.

Professional career

Lynch was selected by the Minnesota Vikings with the 130th overall pick in the fourth round of the 2020 NFL Draft. He made his NFL debut on October 11, 2020 against the Seattle Seahawks on Sunday Night Football and recorded his first career sack on Russell Wilson during the 27–26 loss.

Personal
Lynch's father, Tim, played linebacker for the University of Nebraska and gave him the middle name "Husker" after the school's mascot.

References

External links
Baylor Bears bio

1999 births
Living people
Players of American football from Texas
American football defensive tackles
Baylor Bears football players
People from Round Rock, Texas
All-American college football players
Minnesota Vikings players